Lasswell or Laswell is a surname. Notable people with the surname include:

Alva Lasswell (1905–1988), American Marine Corps officer who decoded the message that led to the death of Yamamoto
Bill Laswell (born 1955), American bassist, producer and record label owner
Butch Laswell (1958–1996), American stunt performer 
Fred Lasswell (1916–2001), American cartoonist
Greg Laswell (born 1974), American musician, recording engineer, and producer
Harold Lasswell (1902–1978), American political scientist and communications theorist
Mary Lasswell (1905–1994), American author
Shirley Slesinger Lasswell (1923–2007), American brand marketing pioneer